Chiti  is a village and the 11th ward of Besisahar Municipality in Lamjung District in the Gandaki Province of northern-central Nepal. It is also a former village development committee of Lamjung District out of 61. At the time of the 2011 Nepal census it had a population of 5166, and it covers the area of 17.62 square kilometer.

References
UN map of the municipalities of Lamjung District

External links
UN map of the municipalities of Lamjung District

Populated places in Lamjung District